The Palompon Institute of Technology- Laboratory Highschool is the laboratory high school of Palompon Institute of Technology in Palompon, Leyte, Philippines.

References

High schools in Leyte (province)